Snake River Desperadoes is a 1951 American Western film directed by Fred F. Sears and written by Barry Shipman. The film stars Charles Starrett, Don Reynolds, Tommy Ivo, Monte Blue and Smiley Burnette. The film was released on May 30, 1951, by Columbia Pictures.

Plot

Cast          
Charles Starrett as Steve Reynolds / The Durango Kid
Don Reynolds as Little Hawk 
Tommy Ivo as Billy Haverly
Monte Blue as Jim Haverly
Smiley Burnette as Smiley Burnette

References

External links
 

1951 films
American Western (genre) films
1951 Western (genre) films
Columbia Pictures films
Films directed by Fred F. Sears
American black-and-white films
1950s English-language films
1950s American films